Rafael Ferreira Donato (born 17 March 1989)  is a Brazilian footballer who plays as a central defender for Vila Nova.

Career
On 24 November 2017, having gone nearly a year since playing his last game for Joinville, Donato joined LigaPro side União da Madeira on a deal until the end of the season.

Honours
Audax Rio
 Copa Rio: 2010

Bahia
 Campeonato Baiano: 2012

References

External links

1989 births
Living people
Footballers from Rio de Janeiro (city)
Brazilian footballers
Association football defenders
Campeonato Brasileiro Série A players
Campeonato Brasileiro Série B players
Campeonato Brasileiro Série D players
Saudi First Division League players
Liga Portugal 2 players
Esporte Clube Bahia players
Cruzeiro Esporte Clube players
Criciúma Esporte Clube players
Joinville Esporte Clube players
C.F. União players
Al-Kawkab FC players
Brasiliense Futebol Clube players
Brazilian expatriate sportspeople in Saudi Arabia
Expatriate footballers in Saudi Arabia
Brazilian expatriate sportspeople in Portugal
Expatriate footballers in Portugal